Stadionul Inter Gaz is a multi-use stadium in Popești-Leordeni, Romania. It is currently used mostly for football matches and is the home ground of SC Popești-Leordeni. The stadium holds 2,000 people.

References

Football venues in Romania
Sport in Ilfov County
Buildings and structures in Ilfov County